Sanjay Awasthy is an Indian politician and Member of Legislative Assembly (MLA) representing Arki in the Himachal Pradesh Legislative Assembly in India.

Early life and education
Awasthy was born on 7 October 1963 in Solan, Himachal Pradesh. He studied at Government Senior Secondary School, Navgaon. Later, he gained his Bachelor of Arts from Government College, Sanjauli, Shimla, and Master of Arts from Himachal Pradesh University, Shimla.

Awasthy played cricket for Himachal Pradesh, including one first-class appearance in the Ranji Trophy in 1989–90.

Political career
Awasthy was elected as President of Block Congress committee Arki in 2009. He contested the 2012 Himachal Pradesh Legislative Assembly election from Arki constituency, but lost. After the death of Virbhadra Singh, the sitting MLA of Arki constituency, in July 2021, by-elections were held in October 2021. Awasthy won the by-election as a candidate of the Indian National Congress.

References

External links
 
http://www.empoweringindia.org/new/constituency.aspx?eid=926&cid=50 
http://www.hpcongress.org/dspmemberdetail.aspx?profile=President+of+Block+Congress+Committee 
https://cricketarchive.com/cgi-bin/player_oracle_reveals_results1.cgi

Living people
1964 births
Himachal Pradesh politicians
Indian National Congress politicians from Himachal Pradesh
Himachal Pradesh cricketers
Himachal Pradesh MLAs 2017–2022
Indian cricketers